Arch Brady Butler (known professionally as "Archie Butler"; September 27, 1911 – February 4, 1977) was an American actor, crewman, and stunt performer.

Biography
Butler was born September 27, 1911, in Rhea County, Tennessee, appeared in numerous moving pictures, particularly Westerns, in such films as Across the Wide Missouri (1947), Annie Get Your Gun (1950), Westward the Women (1951), and The Wild Bunch (1969), and in such television shows as Bonanza, Gunsmoke, The Big Valley, The Rifleman, and The Virginian.

Butler died February February 4, 1977, aged 65, in Overton, Nevada.

Partial filmography
Under Two Flags (1936) - (uncredited)
Wyoming (1940) - Cavalryman (uncredited)
Barbary Coast Gent (1944) - Townsman (uncredited)
West of the Pecos (1945) - Vigilante (uncredited)
Code of the West (1947) - Cowboy (uncredited)
Ambush (1950) - Trooper (uncredited)
Annie Get Your Gun (1950) - Cowboy (uncredited)
Westward the Women (1951) - Outrider (uncredited)
Arena (1953) - Cowboy (uncredited)
Ride, Vaquero! (1953) - Bandit (uncredited)
Gypsy Colt (1954) - Farrier (uncredited)
Man with the Gun (1955) - Henchman (uncredited)
The Brass Legend (1956) - Deputy (uncredited)
The Glory Guys (1965) - Trooper (uncredited)
The Wild Bunch (1969) - Jabalai (uncredited)

References

External links

1911 births
1977 deaths
American stunt performers
People from Rhea County, Tennessee
Male actors from Tennessee
American male film actors
American male television actors
20th-century American male actors
Western (genre) television actors